Oidiodendron fuscum is a species of the genus of Oidiodendron. Oidiodendron fuscum produces the antibiotic Fuscin.

References 

Onygenales
Fungi described in 1932